Exile in the Outer Ring is the fourth studio album by American musician Erika M. Anderson (also known as EMA). It was released on August 25, 2017, under City Slang.

Reception

Accolades

Track listing

References

2017 albums
City Slang albums
Erika M. Anderson albums